Glycogen synthase kinase-3 beta, (GSK-3 beta), is an enzyme that in humans is encoded by the GSK3B gene.  In mice, the enzyme is encoded by the Gsk3b gene. Abnormal regulation and expression of GSK-3 beta is associated with an increased susceptibility towards bipolar disorder.

Function 

Glycogen synthase kinase-3 (GSK-3) is a proline-directed serine-threonine kinase that was initially identified as a phosphorylating and an inactivating agent of glycogen synthase. Two isoforms, alpha (GSK3A) and beta, show a high degree of amino acid homology.  GSK3B is involved in energy metabolism, neuronal cell development, and body pattern formation. It might be a new therapeutic target for ischemic stroke.

Disease relevance 

Homozygous disruption of the Gsk3b locus in mice results in embryonic lethality during mid-gestation.  This lethality phenotype could be rescued by inhibition of tumor necrosis factor.

Two SNPs at this gene, rs334558 (-50T/C) and rs3755557 (-1727A/T), are associated with efficacy of lithium treatment in bipolar disorder.

Signaling pathways 

Pharmacological inhibition of ERK1/2 restores GSK-3 beta activity and protein synthesis levels in a model of tuberous sclerosis.

Interactions 

GSK3B has been shown to interact with:
 KIAA1211L

 AKAP11, 
 AXIN1, 
 AXIN2, 
 AR, 
 CTNNB1, 
 DNM1L, 
MACF1 
 MUC1, 
 SMAD3 
 NOTCH1,
 NOTCH2, 
 P53, 
 PRKAR2A, 
 SGK3,  and
 TSC2.

See also 
 Glycogen synthase kinase 3

References

Further reading

External links 
 PDBe-KB provides an overview of all the structure information available in the PDB for Human Glycogen synthase kinase-3 beta (GSK3B)

Protein kinases
EC 2.7.11